Pacé (Gallo: Paczaé) is a commune in the Ille-et-Vilaine department of Brittany in northwestern France.

Geography
Pacé is on the banks of the River Flûme, itself a tributary of the River Vilaine.   Neighbouring municipalities include Gévezé to the north, La Mézière to the north-east, with La Chapelle-des-Fougeretz and Montgermont in the east.   The capital of Brittany, Rennes lies to the south-east of Pacé.

The little town is positioned along the main road linking the coastal resort of Saint-Brieuc with Rennes.   The road has recently (2013) been upgraded, which has significantly improved access.

Population

Inhabitants of Pacé are called in French Pacéens and Pacéennes .

See also
Communes of the Ille-et-Vilaine department

References

External links

Official website 

Mayors of Ille-et-Vilaine Association 

Communes of Ille-et-Vilaine